Jane Elizabeth Martin  is a British public servant, who has served as Local Government Ombudsman and as a member of the Committee on Standards in Public Life.

Education
Martin has a Ph.D. in educational administration and has studied public leadership at Warwick Business School.

Career
Martin's career  has included research on school administration at the University of Birmingham, School of Education, a post as a local education officer, work with the Improvement and Development Agency for local government, appointment as the first executive director of the Centre for Public Scrutiny in 2003, and in 2007 the role of deputy chief executive of the Local Better Regulation Office.

 she is a lay member of the board of the Legal Ombudsman.

Recognition
Martin was appointed CBE in the 2017 New Year Honours "For services to administrative justice and transparency in local government."

References

Year of birth missing (living people)
Living people
20th-century British women
21st-century British women
Commanders of the Order of the British Empire
Ombudsmen in the United Kingdom
Member of the Committee on Standards in Public Life